is a Japanese rugby union player who plays as a fullback or centre.

In his home country he plays for the Panasonic Wild Knights whom he joined in 2011.   He was also named in the first ever  squad which will compete in Super Rugby from the 2016 season.

References

1988 births
Living people
Japanese rugby union players
Male rugby sevens players
Rugby union fullbacks
Rugby union centres
Saitama Wild Knights players
Sunwolves players
Sportspeople from Kanagawa Prefecture
Japan international rugby union players
Rugby union fly-halves